"I Touch Myself" is a song recorded by the Australian rock band Divinyls. It was written by the songwriting team of Tom Kelly and Billy Steinberg along with Christine Amphlett and Mark McEntee of the Divinyls. It was released in November 1990 as the lead single from the band's fourth album, diVINYLS (1991), and deals with the subjects of eroticism, orgasm and female masturbation. The single achieved success, reaching  1 in Australia and No. 4 on the US Billboard Hot 100. In January 2018, Australian network Triple M ranked the song at No. 60 in its list of the "most Australian" songs of all time.

Composition and recording

Chrissy Amphlett and Mark McEntee wrote the song in 1990 with the songwriting team of Tom Kelly and Billy Steinberg (who had also written songs such as "I'll Stand by You", "Like a Virgin", "Eternal Flame", "True Colors" and "So Emotional"). Steinberg had written the first verse and the chorus lyric for "I Touch Myself" and Amphlett liked it immediately. The next day, McEntee, Steinberg, Kelly and Amphlett wrote the remainder of the song despite the fact that Steinberg and Kelly rarely collaborated with others.

The song was recorded to two-inch tape, making it difficult to edit. After much experimentation, the writers devised an unusual song structure with the bridge placed after the first chorus. It is written in the key of F major.

Promotion and chart performance
In Australia, "I Touch Myself" was released on 19 November 1990 on 7-inch and cassette, and the CD single was released on 3 December 1990. The single debuted at No. 77 on 2 December 1990. On its tenth week on the chart, the song reached No. 1, replacing Vanilla Ice's debut single "Ice Ice Baby", and stayed there for another week. The single was certified platinum in Australia.

"I Touch Myself" debuted on the UK Singles Chart at No. 69 and on its eighth week it peaked at No. 10, spending a total of twelve weeks in the chart. When released in the United States, the song caused a minor controversy. However, it managed to reach the top five of the Billboard Hot 100 chart, peaking at No. 4, and at No. 2 on the Billboard Modern Rock Tracks chart after receiving extensive play on modern rock radio. Divinyls are considered a one-hit wonder in the U.S., as "I Touch Myself" was their only American top-40 hit.

Critical reception
Alex Henderson from AllMusic described the song as "infectious," while editor Adrian Zupp called it a "lascivious headline-grabber." A reviewer from Billboard stated that it's a "modern rock smash," noting lead singer Christina Amphlett's video appearance as "eye-catching." James Muretich from Calgary Herald joked, "One gathers she`s not talking about scratching her nose". Magazine Music & Media wrote that "it will stay in your mind for the rest of the week." Alan Jones from Music Week commented, "'I Touch Myself' has already been a number one single in their native Australia, and is now in the US Top 10. It won't do that well here, but its loose, post-punk execution and killer hook add up to a hit." Caroline Sullivan from Smash Hits called it "one of pop's finer nanoseconds" in her review of the DiVINYLS album.

Music video
The song's accompanying music video, directed by Michael Bay, was nominated for three MTV Video Music Awards, including Video of the Year.

I Touch Myself Project
The I Touch Myself Project was launched in 2014, 12 months after Amphlett's death from breast cancer. Amphlett wanted "I Touch Myself" to be adapted as a global anthem for breast health. The project was created in her honour with its mission to create educational forums to promote self-examination.

In June 2014, Connie Mitchell, Deborah Conway, Kate Ceberano, Katie Noonan, Little Pattie, Megan Washington, Olivia Newton-John, Sarah Blasko, Sarah McLeod and Suze DeMarchi released a version of "I Touch Myself", with each providing her own interpretation and distinct style to the song. This version, credited to the I Touch Myself Project, peaked at No. 72 on the ARIA chart.

In 2016, the I Touch Myself Project partnered with Berlei to create the Chrissy Bra, which reminds women to examine their breasts for anomalies when dressing, and a Chrissy Post-Surgery Bra, designed specifically for women who have undergone breast-cancer surgery.

In 2018, Serena Williams recorded "I Touch Myself" and posted her version on Instagram. It became Instagram's most retweeted post, most widely discussed campaign and most watched video during International Breast Cancer Awareness Month.

Track listings
 7-inch, cassette, and mini-CD single
 Australian CD single
 "I Touch Myself"
 "Follow Through"

 UK 12-inch and CD single
 "I Touch Myself"
 "Follow Through"
 "I Touch Myself" (alternate version)

Charts

Weekly charts

Year-end charts

Certifications

Release history

Cover versions
 Gina Riley parodied the song on Fast Forward.
 "Weird Al" Yankovic included a verse from the song in the polka medley "Polka Your Eyes Out" from Off the Deep End (later collected on Permanent Record).
 FHM High Street Honeys released a version of the song in 2007, peaking at number 34 on the UK Singles Chart in February 2007.
Lime Cordiale released a cover of the song in 2019 for Triple J's Like a Version that reached number 17 in the 2019 Triple J Hottest 100.

Usage in other media
The song has been featured in the 1997 comedy film Austin Powers: International Man of Mystery, as a cover version by Scala & Kolacny Brothers during the first episode of the second season of Sex Education and in the Friends episode "The One Where Monica Sings."

References

1990 singles
1991 singles
2006 singles
Divinyls songs
Songs written by Tom Kelly (musician)
Songs written by Billy Steinberg
Number-one singles in Australia
Songs written by Chrissy Amphlett
Songs written by Mark McEntee
Music videos directed by Michael Bay
Virgin Records singles
1990 songs
Masturbation in fiction
Female masturbation
Australian soft rock songs